The Men's alpine combined competition at the FIS Alpine World Ski Championships 2019 was held on 11 February 2019.

Results
The downhill was started at 12:00 and the slalom at 16:00.

References

Men's alpine combined